The Bundesstraße 11a (B11a) is a German federal highway in Bavaria, Germany.

Overview
The B11a serves as a feeder road between the A95 (motorway junction 6 at Wolfratshausen) and the B11 at Wolfratshausen.

Freising district
In addition, there was a motorway feeder in the district of Freising under the name B11a, which served as the eastern bypass the city of Freising. This ran between the motorway junction Freising-Ost of the A92 and the former B11. In the course of downgrading the B11 to a state highway, the road has now been rededicated however as B301.

References

External links

Roads in Bavaria
11a